Ali Firouzi (born 11 March 1955 in Abadan, Iran) is an Iranian football coach and retired player who recently served as caretaker manager at Sanat Naft, in the absence of Acácio Casimiro due to a cancer illness. He formerly managed Sanat Naft twice, first from 1992 to 1994 when he promoted to the head coach after was assistant coach for two years and a returns in 1995 that ended in 1999. He was also head coach of Esteghlal Ahvaz for one season.

References

1955 births
Living people
Iranian footballers
Sanat Naft Abadan F.C. players
Association football forwards
Iranian football managers
People from Abadan, Iran
Footballers at the 1982 Asian Games
Asian Games competitors for Iran
Sanat Naft Abadan F.C. managers
Iranian people of African descent
Sportspeople from Khuzestan province